Olivier Rey (birth 1964 in Nantes), is a French conservative philosopher. He is a critic of transhumanism.

Works 
Novels
  Le Bleu du sang, Flammarion, coll. « Fiction Française », 1994 
  Après la chute, Pierre-Guillaume de Roux Éditions, 2014 

Essays
  Itinéraire de l'égarement. Du rôle de la science dans l'absurdité contemporaine, Le Seuil, 2003 
  Une folle solitude. Le fantasme de l'homme auto-construit, Le Seuil, 2006 
  Le Testament de Melville : Penser le bien et le mal avec Billy Budd, Gallimard, coll. « Bibliothèque des idées », 2011 
  Une question de taille, Stock, coll. « Les essais », 2014 .
  Quand le monde s'est fait nombre, Stock, coll. « Les essais », 2016

References

1964 births
Philosophers of science
21st-century French philosophers
21st-century French writers
21st-century French essayists
École Polytechnique alumni
Living people